Pan-African Universities Debating Championship (PAUDC) is the biggest intercollegiate debate championship in Africa, established in 2008 by the University of Botswana Debate Masters Association. PAUDC is held in the British Parliamentary debate format (involving four teams of two people in each debate).

The current PAUDC champions are Ayafa Tonye and Edwin Ochiedo from Veritas University. The 2022 edition was hosted by Strathmore University in Kenya and was dubbed Paudc Mashujaa.

The 2021 edition of the PAUDC was the 2nd edition to be held virtually as a result of travel restrictions and other issues caused by the COVID-19 pandemic. The virtual tournament was hosted by the University of Botswana Debate Masters Association in Botswana under the theme, “Channelling the roots of African Debate.”

History 
The OSI African Regional Office and the Youth Initiative partnered with the Pan-African Universities Debating Championship (PAUDC) organizing committee and the University of Botswana to organize the first-ever Pan African Universities Debating Championship in 2008 to provide students from various African universities the opportunity to interrogate issues of African and Global importance.

Format 
The championship is usually held in eight days. It usually takes place in the first two weeks of December and is being hosted in a different country every year

The PAUDC structure is the British Parliamentary (BP), made up of four teams of two, with two teams supporting a motion, and two teams opposing. Debating teams are independent and compete with each other.

The competition involves nine preliminary rounds, which become "power-paired" as the tournament progresses, matching the strongest-performing teams against each other. The process of scoring and pairing these teams is known as "tabbing". The scoring of teams is done by judges, most of whom are students or former students from the competing institutions, who return "ballots" with their scores to the adjudication team, led by a Chief Adjudicator who is assisted by one or more deputies.

At the end of the debate, teams are ranked from 1st to 4th.

The team names are as follows.  Opening Government (OG), consisting of the Prime Minister and Deputy Prime Minister; Opening Opposition (OO), consisting of the Opposition Leader and Deputy Opposition Leader; Closing Government (CG), consisting of the Government Member and Government Whip; and Closing Opposition (CO), consisting of the Opposition Member and the Opposition Whip.

The speaking order is Prime Minister, Opposition Leader, Deputy Prime Minister, Deputy Opposition Leader, and so forth.

List of tournaments

See also 

 World universities debating championship
Literary and Debating Society (NUI Galway)

References 

Debating competitions
Student events